The gens Luria was a minor plebeian family at ancient Rome.  Although many Lurii are known from inscriptions, the only member of this gens to play a significant role in history was Marcus Lurius, a lieutenant of Octavian in the years following the death of Caesar.

Members
 Marcus Lurius, governor of Sardinia in 40 BC, during the war against Sextus Pompey, fought off an invasion led by Menas; but while giving chase he was defeated, and forced to abandon the island. In 31 BC, Lurius commanded the right wing of Octavian's fleet at the Battle of Actium.
 Publius Lurius Agrippa, a triumvir monetalis in the time of Augustus.
 Lurius Varus, consul sometime between 40 and 46, was expelled from the Senate for extortion while as proconsul of Pannonia or Dalmatia. He secured his re-admittance in 57 with the help of Otho.
 Marcus Lurius Varus, mentioned in an inscription at Reate. His relation to the other Lurii is uncertain.

See also
 List of Roman gentes

References

Bibliography

 Appianus Alexandrinus (Appian), Bellum Civile (The Civil War).
 Lucius Cassius Dio Cocceianus (Cassius Dio), Roman History.
 Marcus Velleius Paterculus, Compendium of Roman History.
 Fulvius Ursinus, Familiae Romanae quae Reperiuntur in Antiquis Numismatibus (Roman Families Found in Ancient Coins), Rome (1577).
 Jean Foy-Vaillant, Numismata Imperatorum Romanorum Praestantiora a Julio Caesare ad Postumus (Outstanding Imperial Coins from Caesar to Postumus), Giovanni Battista Bernabò & Giuseppe Lazzarini, Rome (1674, 1743).
 Dictionary of Greek and Roman Biography and Mythology, William Smith, ed., Little, Brown and Company, Boston (1849).
 Ronald Syme, "Lurius Varus, a Stray Consular Legate", in Harvard Studies in Classical Philology, vol. 88, pp. 165–169 (1984).
 François Jacques, "L'origine du domaine de la Villa Magna Variana id est Mappalia Siga (Henchir Mettich): une hypothèse", in Antiquités africaines, vol. 29, pp. 63–69 (1993).

Roman gentes